The following railroads have been named Union Railroad or Union Railway, usually because they connected or merged several other railroads.

Freight carriers 
Union Railroad (Pittsburgh), 1889-present
Union Railroad (Illinois), 1852–1881, an Illinois railroad, predecessor of the Michigan Central Railroad (New York Central system)
Union Railroad of Baltimore (Maryland), 1866–1976, predecessor of the Pennsylvania Railroad
Union Railroad (Massachusetts freight railway), 1848–1854, predecessor of the Boston and Albany Railroad (New York Central system)
Union Freight Railroad, 1872–1970, part of the New York, New Haven and Hartford Railroad system in Boston, Massachusetts
Union Railroad (Onondaga County, New York), 1856–1858, a New York railroad, predecessor of the Delaware, Lackawanna and Western Railroad
Union Railroad (Rockland County, New York), 1851–1946, a New York railroad, predecessor of the Erie Railroad
Union Railroad (Ohio), 1858–1860, an Ohio railroad, predecessor of the Baltimore and Ohio Railroad
Union Railroad of Oregon, 1927–1993, an Oregon railroad
Union Railway (Oregon), 1890–1906, an Oregon railroad, predecessor of the above
Union Railway (Chattanooga, Tennessee), 1883–1888, a Tennessee railroad, belt line
Union Railway (Memphis, Tennessee), a Tennessee railroad, belt line

Street railways 
Union Railway (Bronx) in New York City
Union Railroad (Brooklyn) in New York City
Union Railroad (Massachusetts street railway) in the Boston area; see North Cambridge Carhouse
Union Railroad (Missouri), a streetcar in St. Louis
Union Railway (Missouri) in St. Joseph, a Missouri railroad

Union Railroad (Rhode Island) in Providence, a Rhode Island railroad
Union Railroad (Washington), a streetcar in Washington, D.C.

Other railways
The following railroads had Union Railroad or Union Railway in their names:

Baltimore Coal and Union Railroad, part of the Delaware and Hudson Railroad system

Chattanooga Union Railway, a Tennessee railroad
Channel Tunnel Rail Link (High Speed 1), Kent, England
Dayton and Union Railroad, Union City, Indiana, to Dodson, Ohio, an Ohio railroad
Dayton Union Railway, Dayton, Ohio, an Ohio railroad
Delaware River and Union Railroad, Marcus Hook, Pennsylvania, a Pennsylvania railroad
Des Moines Union Railway, Des Moines, Iowa, an Iowa railroad
Detroit Union Railroad Depot and Station Company, Detroit, Michigan, a Michigan railroad
Fort Wayne Union Railway, Fort Wayne, Indiana, an Indiana railroad
Fremont, Lima and Union Railway, Fremont, Ohio to Rushville, Indiana via Union City, Indiana

Galena and Chicago Union Railroad, Chicago to Clinton, Iowa
Indianapolis Union Railway, belt line around Indianapolis, Indiana
Jacques Cartier Union Railway, a railway in Quebec, Canada
Kentucky Union Railway, Lexington to Jackson, Kentucky, a Kentucky railroad

Minneapolis Union Railway, Minneapolis, Minnesota, a Minnesota railroad
Montana Union Railway, Butte to Garrison, Montana
Northwestern Union Railroad, Milwaukee to Fond du Lac, Wisconsin; see Chicago and Milwaukee Railway
Ogden Union Railway and Depot, Ogden, Utah; see Union Station
Peoria and Pekin Union Railway, Pekin to Peoria, Illinois

Rock River Valley Union Railroad, state line to Fond du Lac, Wisconsin, a Wisconsin railroad
Spartanburg and Union Railroad, Alston to Spartanburg, South Carolina
State Line and Union Railroad, Genoa, Illinois to Columbus, Wisconsin, a Wisconsin railroad
Troy Union Railroad and Depot, Troy, New York, a New York Central Railroad precursor
Tulsa-Sapulpa Union Railway, reporting mark: TSU
Union Pacific Railroad, the largest railroad in the United States

Union Railroad, Transfer and Stock Yard Company, an Indiana railroad

Union Railway and Transit Company, St. Louis, Missouri, an Illinois railroad
Western Union Railroad, Racine, Wisconsin, a Wisconsin railroad
Wisconsin Union Railroad, Milwaukee, Wisconsin to Illinois state line, a Wisconsin railroad

See also
Joint railway, a railway operating under the control of more than one railway company
International Union of Railways
American Railway Union
Union Station (disambiguation)
Etihad Railway, formerly known as United Arab Emirates Union Railway

References
Railroad History Database
 

Lists of railway lines
Lists of railway companies